The 2003 Australian GT Performance Car Championship was a CAMS sanctioned national motor racing title for production based cars. Procar Australia was appointed as the category manager for the championship, which was staged as part of the 2003 Procar Championship Series. It was the inaugural Australian GT Performance Car Championship, GT Performance Cars having previously competed in the Australian GT Production Car Championship as a separate class. 

The 2003 Drivers’ Championship was won by Mark King, driving a Mitsubishi Lancer Evo VII and the Manufacturers’ Trophy was awarded to Mitsubishi.

Calendar
The championship was contested over an eight round series.

Rounds were contested over three races except for the Oran Park round, which was contested over two races.

Points system
Points towards the Drivers Championship were awarded in each race as per the following table. 

In addition, three championship points were awarded to the driver who obtained Pole Position for Race 1 at each round.

Points towards the Manufacturers' Trophy were awarded on the same scale as applied to the Drivers' Championship.

Results

Drivers Championship

Manufacturers’ Trophy

FTE and FPV models were considered to be Fords for the Manufacturers’ Trophy.

References

Australian Performance Car Championship
GT Performance

External links
 Image of championship winner Mark King driving a Mitsubishi Lancer Evo VII at the Adelaide Parklands Circuit in Round 1 of the championship, www.procar.com.au, as archived at web.archive.org